Grevillea spinosissima is species of flowering plant in the family Proteaceae and is endemic to the southwest of Western Australia.  It is a spiny shrub with three-part leaves with sharply-pointed, linear lobes, and clusters of creamy-white and green to mauve flowers with a white style.

Description
The edges of the leaves are rolled under, enclosing the lower surface apart from the midvein.

Taxonomy
Grevillea spinosissima was first formally described in 1986 by the botanist Donald McGillivray in his book New Names in Grevillea (Proteaceae) from specimens he collected with Alex George near Manmanning in 1976. The specific epithet (spinosissima) is means "very spiny", referring to the leaves.

Distribution and habitat
This grevillea grows in heath, shrubland, or open shrubby woodland, sometimes in disturbed areas and is found from Wongan Hills to near Quairading and York in the Avon Wheatbelt, Geraldton Sandplains and Jarrah Forest bioregions of south-western Western Australia.

Conservation status
This grevillea is listed as "not threatened" by the Government of Western Australia Department of Biodiversity, Conservation and Attractions.

See also
 List of Grevillea species

References

spinosissima
Proteales of Australia
Eudicots of Western Australia
Taxa named by Donald McGillivray
Plants described in 1986